Lucille Opitz (born 24 November 1977) is a German speed skater who won a gold medal in the women's team pursuit at the 2006 Winter Olympics.

External links

1977 births
German female speed skaters
Speed skaters at the 2006 Winter Olympics
Olympic speed skaters of Germany
Medalists at the 2006 Winter Olympics
Olympic medalists in speed skating
Olympic gold medalists for Germany
Speed skaters from Berlin
Living people
World Single Distances Speed Skating Championships medalists
21st-century German women